Joseph Ernest Meyer (September 5, 1878 – March 9, 1950) was a botanist, writer, illustrator, publisher, and supplier of pharmaceutical-grade herbs and roots to the drug trade who became a prominent citizen and eventually a millionaire in Northwest Indiana. He was the founder of the Indiana Botanic Gardens, Calumet National Bank and Meyer Publishing (now MeyerBooks). At his death he was said to be the world's largest distributor of herbs used in salves, cosmetics, and medicines.

The Herbalist publications 

Meyer not only supplied large pharmaceutical firms with drug-grade botanicals, he made up and packaged medical, culinary, and magical herbs for retail sales through his mail order catalogues and yearly almanacs. Many of the plants were raised in Indiana, but he also travelled the world to connect with growers in tropical and Mediterranean climates, and was a major importer of raw botanicals. The Indiana Botanic Garden  catalogues and almanacs were illustrated with his own artwork, both line-art and water colours, and he wrote extensively about the folkloric customs employed by herbalists from many cultures. The articles and illustrations that he produced for the yearly catalogues were eventually collected into books, among which the most popular was titled The Herbalist and Herb Doctor.

After Meyer's death, his grandson, Clarence Meyer, gathered some of the previously uncollected almanac articles for posthumous publication, with additional artwork which he drew himself.

Residences 

Meyer built an elaborate residence called Meyer's Castle in today's Dyer; he lived there until his death in 1950.

He also constructed a mansion along the north side of the Little Calumet River in Hammond, Indiana, in association with his Indiana Botanic Gardens. This mansion functioned as the headquarters of the Indiana Botanic Gardens until 1990, when the family-owned company moved to a newer facility in Hobart, Indiana. The mansion still stands today and is used by Hluska Enterprises Inc. During the summer, it is a retail fireworks outlet and in the fall it is the site of Reaper's Realm Haunted House. Meyer died in Miami, Florida, on March 9, 1950.

Publications

The Herbalist and Herb Doctor. Hammond, IN: Indiana Herb Gardens, 1918.
The Old Herb Doctor. Glenwood, IL: Meyerbooks, 1984.
Nature's Remedies: Early History and Uses of Botanic Drugs as Revealed in the Legends and Anecdotes of Ancient Times. Hammond, IN: Indiana Botanic Gardens, 1934.
The Herb Doctor and Medicine Man: A Collection of Valuable Medicinal Formulae and Guide to the Manufacture of Botanical Medicines. Copyrighted 1922 by Joseph E Meyer, Hammond, Ind.

References

1878 births
1950 deaths
American botanists
People from Kenosha, Wisconsin